Artem Rostyslavovych Dudik (born 2 January 1997) is a Ukrainian professional football forward.

Club career

Youth years
Dudik is the product of the FC Volyn Lutsk School Systems. His first trainer was Mykola Klyots.

Volyn Lutsk
He made his debut in the Ukrainian Premier League for FC Volyn Lutsk in a game against FC Metalist Kharkiv on 6 March 2016.

Sandecja Nowy Sącz
On 26 August 2020, he signed a two-year contract with Polish I liga club Sandecja Nowy Sącz.

Club

References

External links

Statistics at Ukrainian Premier League website

1997 births
Sportspeople from Volyn Oblast
Living people
Ukrainian footballers
Ukraine under-21 international footballers
Association football forwards
FC Volyn Lutsk players
FC Shakhtar Donetsk players
FC Slutsk players
FC Mariupol players
Sandecja Nowy Sącz players
FC Ahrobiznes Volochysk players
FC VPK-Ahro Shevchenkivka players
FC Metalist 1925 Kharkiv players
Ukrainian Premier League players
Ukrainian First League players
Belarusian Premier League players
I liga players
Ukrainian expatriate footballers
Expatriate footballers in Belarus
Expatriate footballers in Poland
Ukrainian expatriate sportspeople in Belarus
Ukrainian expatriate sportspeople in Poland
21st-century Ukrainian people